The 2019 European Cadet Judo Championships is an edition of the European Cadet Judo Championships, organised by the International Judo Federation. It was held at the Arena COS Torwar in Warsaw, Poland from 27 to 30 June 2019. The final day of competition featured a mixed team event, won by team Turkey.

Medal summary

Medal table

Men's events

Women's events

Source Results

Mixed

Source Results

References

External links
 

 U18
European Cadet Judo Championships
European Championships, U18
Judo
Judo competitions in Poland
Judo
Judo, European Championships U18